Vondráček (feminine Vondráčková) is a Czech surname, it may refer to:

Vondráček
 Jan Vondráček (born 1966), Czech actor
 Jiří Vondráček (born 1993), Czech footballer
 Petr Vondráček (born 1977), Czech kickboxer
 Radek Vondráček, Czech politician
 Roman Vondráček, (born 1984), Czech ice hockey player
 Vladimír Vondráček (1895–1978), Czech psychiatrist

Vondráčková
 Helena Vondráčková (born 1947), Czech singer
 Lucie Vondráčková (born 1980), Czech singer and actress

See also
 17251 Vondracek, a main belt asteroid
 Ondráček, another variant of this surname

Czech-language surnames
Surnames from given names